Fort Reliance Water Aerodrome  is located in Chalton Bay, adjacent to Fort Reliance, Northwest Territories, Canada. It is open from mid-June until September.

References

Registered aerodromes in the North Slave Region
Seaplane bases in the Northwest Territories